Barra Bonita may refer to the following places in Brazil:

 Barra Bonita, Santa Catarina
 Barra Bonita, São Paulo